The concours de façades de la ville de Paris was an architecture competition organized by the city of Paris at the very end of the 19th century.

History 
The contest was held annually between 1898 and the late 1930s, with an interruption during World War I. It recognized several buildings completed during the year.

The Parisian contest was originally set up after the creation of the rue Réaumur in 1897 in order to promote the construction of original and attractive buildings on this street. It was initially restricted to the rue Réaumur, but was ultimately extended to the whole of Paris.

Winners 
(partial list)
 1898:
 Hector Guimard, castel Béranger, 14 rue Jean-de-La-Fontaine, 16th arrondissement of Paris.
 Georges Debrie, 24 rue du Roi-de-Sicile, 4th
 Charles Breffendille, 18 rue Croix-des-Petits-Champs, 1st
 Louis-Pierre Marquet, 204 rue de Grenelle, 7th
 Henri Bunel and Fernand Dupuis, 39 rue d'Antin, 2nd
 Michel Rabier, 87 boulevard de la Villette, 10th
 1899:
 Richard Bouwens van der Boijen, 8 rue de Lota, 16th.
 17 avenue de Breteuil, 7th
 Eugène Bruneau, 270 boulevard Raspail, 14th
 Alexandre Marcel, 17 avenue de Breteuil, 7th
 Georges Morin-Goustiaux, 1 rue Le Peletier, 9th
 Gustave Rives, 45 rue du Château-d'Eau, 10th
 1900:
 Edouard Arnaud rue Octave Feuillet, 16th
 Édouard Perrone, 3 rue Danton, 6th
 Gustave Goy, 21 rue Monsieur, 7th
 Jacques Hermant, 85-87 rue du Faubourg-Saint-Martin
 Paul Legriel, 170 rue de la Convention, 15th
 Albert le Voisvenel, 81 rue Malakoff, 16th
 1901:
 Jules Lavirotte, Lavirotte Building, 29 avenue Rapp, 7th.
 Gaston Dupommereulle, 201 bis Boulevard Saint-Germain, 7th
 G. Pasquier, 201 boulevard Saint-Germain, 7th
 Alphonse Fiquet, 38-40 rue Condorcet, 9th
 Paul Noël, place des Saussayes, 8th
 Charles Labro, 4-6 rue de l'Abbaye, 6th
 1902:
 Jacques Muscat, 45 rue de Bellechasse, 7th
 Henri-Paul Nénot, 17 rue Lafitte, 9th
 Charles Labouret, 23 rue de Mogador, 9th
 Maurice Hodanger, 38 bis rue Fabert, 7th
 Adolphe Bocage, 133 boulevard de Ménilmontant, 11th
 Henry Delage, 164-166 rue de Courcelles, 17th
 1903:
 Charles Klein, 9 rue Claude-Chahu and 2 rue Eugène-Manuel, 16th.
 Stéphane Natanson, 98 avenue de Malakoff, 16th
 Paul Friesé, 98 quai de la Rapée, 12th
 Armand Sibien, 250 rue Saint-Honoré, 8th
 A. Walwein, 96 rue Beaubourg, 4e
 Charles Goujon, 51 rue Damrémont, 18th
 1904:
 Albert Benz, 26 rue François 1er
 Roger Bouvard and Gustave Umbdenstock, 10 rue Alphand, 13th
 Michel Le Tourneau, 36 rue de Bellechasse, 7th
 Louis Parent, 19 rue Spontini, 16th
 Georges Pradelle, 6 rue de Luynes, 7th
 1905:
 Jules Lavirotte, 34 avenue de Wagram, 8th
 Théophile Leclerc, 48 rue Neuve-des-Petits-Champs, 2nd
 Pellechet, 9 rue Pillet-Will, 9th
 Auguste Garriguenc, 48 bis rue de Rivoli, 4th
 Hans-Georg Tersling, 41-49 rue de la Faisanderie, 16th
 Joseph Charlet and F. Perrin, 43 rue des Couronnes, 20th
 1906:
 Henri Deglane, 90 rue de Grenelle, 7th
 Louis-Pierre Marquet, 14 rue de la Pitié
 Ernest Picard, 8 rue Dehodencq, 16th
 Louis Sortais, 7 and 7 bis rue de Paradis, 10th
 1907:
 P. Humbert, 124 avenue Victor-Hugo, 16th
 Jules Lavirotte, 23 avenue de Messine, 17th
 Félix Le Nevé and Albert d'Hont, 44 rue de Bassano, 8th
 Marcel Auburtin, 13 rue de la Paix, 2nd
 Eugène Chifflot, 110 boulevard Raspail, 6th
 Bruno Pelissier, 51 rue Saint-Georges, 9th
 1908:
 Mourzelas, 77 avenue Parmentier, 11th
 Joseph Cassien-Bernard and Paul Friesé, 11 rue Pillet-Will, 9th
 Emile Jarlat, 82 rue Saint-Lazare, 9th
 Charles Stoullig, 83 avenue Henri-Martin, 16th
 Jean Naville and Achille Chauquet, 42, cours de la Reine, 8th
 Roger Bouvard, 23 rue de la Paix, 2nd
 1909:
 Charles Roussi, 64 rue Pergolèse, 16th
 Henry Duray and Godon, 2 avenue de Camoëns, 16th
 Albert Turin and Maurice Turin, 6 rue Fessart, 19th
 Jules Formigé and Emmanuel Gonse, 6 rue Dufrenoy, 16th
 Rigaud, Charles Duval and Emmanuel Gonse, 6 rue aux Ours, 3rd
 P. Rigaud, Charles Duval, Emmanuel Gonse, 4 bis rue aux Ours, 3rd
 1910:
 Charles Dupuy, 24 avenue de Saxe, 15th
 Prosper Bobin and Maurice Sandoz, 10 rue Pierre-Curie
 Georges Bourgouin, 9 rue Lalô, 16th
 Léon and René Carrier, 84 avenue Niel, 17th
 Ernest Picard, 4 rue Verdi, 16th
 Joseph Charlet and F. Perrin, 24-26 rue Charles-Baudelaire, 12th
 1911:
 Raoul Brandon : 199-201 rue de Charenton, 12th
 Théophile Leclerc, 2 rue Léon-Vaudoyer, 7th
 Ernest Picard and Gustave Umbdenstock, 140 rue de la Tour, 16th
 Feugneur, 31 avenue Félix Faure, 15th
 Roger Bouvard, 2 rue de Buenos Aires, 7th
 André Arfvidson, 31-31 bis rue Campagne-Première, 14th
 1912:
 Charles Labro, 19 boulevard Suchet, 16th
 Eugène Chifflot, 149 boulevard Haussmann, 8th
 Georges Guiard, 33 rue Daru and 55 boulevard de Courcelles, 8th
 Mathieu Vimort, 3 avenue Élysée-Reclus, 7th
 1913:
 Émile Molinié, 7 rue Lebouis, 14th.
 1922–123 :
 Raoul Brandon, 1 rue Huysmans, 6th
 1926:
 Georges Albenque and Eugène Gonnot, 46-48 Rue du Général-Brunet, 19th
 Henri Sauvage, 137 boulevard Raspail, 6th
 1928:
 Hector Guimard, Guimard Building, 18 rue Henri-Heine, Paris 16th
 1929:
 Joseph Bassompierre, Emmanuel-Elisée Pontremoli, Paul de Rutté, Pierre Sirvin, 36 rue Antoine-Chantin and 47 rue des Plantes, 14th
 1930:
 Gabriel Brun, Hôtel Regina de Passy, 6 rue de la Tour, 16th

See also 
 French architecture
 Paris architecture of the Belle Époque
 Architecture of Paris

Notes and references 

History of Paris
Architecture awards